The Bradsher cycloaddition reaction, also known as the Bradsher cyclization reaction is a form of the Diels–Alder reaction which involves the [4+2] addition of a common dienophile with a  cationic aromatic azadiene such as acridizinium or isoquinolinium.

The Bradsher cycloaddition was first reported by C. K. Bradsher and T. W. G. Solomons in 1958.

References

Name reactions
Cycloadditions